This article is about communications systems in Samoa.

In 2009, the Samoa-American Samoa (SAS) Cable provided inter-island communication, as well as enabling users in Samoa to access the ASH cable capacity and connect to the global networks. While ASH Cable and SAS Cable are much smaller than the huge systems across the North Pacific, they will provide more than 40 times the capacity currently in use in both island groups combined.

Telephone

Main lines in use:
8,000 (2005)

Telephones - mobile cellular:
>30,000 (2005)

Telephone system:
domestic:
GSM mobile phone network covering 90% of the country (2006) and a landline system covering 65% of country.
international:
satellite earth station - 1 Intelsat (Pacific Ocean)

Radio
Broadcast stations:
AM 1, FM 5, shortwave 0 (2005)

Radios:
90% of 23.098 households had at least one radio (2001 census)

Television
Broadcast stations:
3 (in process of switching from PAL broadcast standard to NTSC) (2005)

Televisions:
15,603 (2001 census)

Internet
Internet Service Providers (ISPs):
3 (2005)

Country code (Top level domain): .ws, .as

References

 
Samoa
Samoa